Argyractis dodalis is a moth in the family Crambidae. It is found in Guyana.

References

Acentropinae
Moths of South America
Moths described in 1924